Subhash Chopra (born 23 October 1947) is an Indian politician from Delhi. He thrice served as member of Delhi Legislative Assembly who represented Kalkaji Assembly constituency. He has served as the President of Delhi Pradesh Congress Committee.

Position held

References

Living people
20th-century Indian politicians
Indian National Congress politicians from Delhi
Speakers of the Delhi Legislative Assembly
1947 births
Presidents of Delhi Pradesh Congress Committee
Delhi MLAs 1998–2003
Delhi MLAs 2003–2008
Delhi MLAs 2008–2013